Horești may refer to several places in Moldova:

Horești, a commune in Fălești District
Horești, a commune in Ialoveni District

See also 
 Hora (disambiguation)
 Horea (disambiguation)